Canon Sinuum may refer to:

 Canon Sinuum (Bürgi), a sine table by Jost Bürgi.
 Canon Sinuum (Pitiscus), the table by Bartholomaeus Pitiscus
 Canon Sinuum (Vlacq), the table by Adriaan Vlacq